Thrikkadeeri -II  is a village in Palakkad district in the state of Kerala, India.

Demographics
 India census, Thrikkadeeri -II had a population of 14681 with 7024 males and 7657 females.

Schools
Kuttikode English Medium Central School (KEMCS), Kuttikode

References

Villages in Palakkad district